The  is a Japanese garden located in the city of Tatebayashi, Gunma Prefecture, Japan, which is a nationally designated Place of Scenic Beauty. It is also one of then "100 Japanese historical parks" designated in 2006 by the Ministry of Land, Infrastructure, Transport and Tourism to mark the 50th anniversary of the Urban Parks Law.

Overview
This park was originally a garden for the daimyō of Tatebayashi Domain and was constructed in the early Edo period. It contains about 10,000 azalea plants, some of which are over 800 years old and is a popular sightseeing spot in Gunma Prefecture when the plants bloom from late April to early May. The park formerly contained a greenhouse with exotic plants (closed in 2010) and an aquarium (closed in 2015). The park has a total area of 49,890 square meters. It was designated a National Place of Scenic Beauty in 1934.

It is located about 25 minutes on foot from Tatebayashi Station on the Tobu Railway Isesaki Line.

It is featured as the 'ha' card in Jomo Karuta.

Gallery

See also
 List of Places of Scenic Beauty of Japan (Gunma)

References

External links

Tourist Guide of Gunma Prefecture
Tobu Railways home page
Tatebayashi City home page 

Gardens in Gunma Prefecture
Places of Scenic Beauty
Tatebayashi, Gunma
Hanami spots of Japan